Channing Matthew Tatum (born April 26, 1980) is an American actor. Tatum made his film debut in the drama Coach Carter (2005), and had his breakthrough role in the 2006 dance film Step Up. He gained wider attention for his leading roles in the comedy-drama Magic Mike (2012) and its sequels Magic Mike XXL (2015) and Magic Mike's Last Dance (2023), the latter two of which he also produced, and in the action-comedy 21 Jump Street (2012) and its sequel 22 Jump Street (2014).

Tatum has also appeared as Duke in the action film G.I. Joe: The Rise of Cobra (2009) and its sequel G.I. Joe: Retaliation (2013). His other films include She's the Man (2006), White House Down (2013), Foxcatcher (2014), The Hateful Eight (2015), Hail, Caesar! (2016), Logan Lucky (2017), and The Lost City (2022). Tatum has also starred in, produced and co-directed the road film Dog (2022). Time magazine named him one of the 100 most influential people in the world in 2022.

Early life
Tatum was born on April 26, 1980, in Cullman, Alabama, to Kay Tatum (née Faust), an airline worker, and Glenn Tatum, a construction worker. He has a sister named Paige. He is of mostly English ancestry.

His family moved to the Pascagoula, Mississippi area when he was six. He grew up in the bayous near the Pascagoula River, where he lived in a rural setting.

Tatum has discussed having dealt with attention deficit disorder (ADD) and dyslexia while growing up, which affected his ability to do well in school. Growing up, Tatum played football, soccer, track, and baseball; he has said that "girls were always [his] biggest distraction in school." As a child, he practiced wuzuquan kung fu.

Tatum spent most of his teenage years in the Tampa area, and initially attended Gaither High School. His parents wanted more effort and gave him the option of selecting a private high school or attending a military school; he chose Tampa Catholic High School, where he graduated in 1998 and was voted most athletic. He later attended Glenville State College in Glenville, West Virginia on a football scholarship, but dropped out. He returned home and started working odd jobs.

Us Weekly reported that around this time Tatum left his job as a roofer and began working as a stripper at a local nightclub, under the name "Chan Crawford". In 2010, he told an Australian newspaper that he wanted to make a movie about his experiences as a stripper. That idea led to the movie Magic Mike. Tatum moved to Miami, where he was discovered by a model talent scout.

Career

Early work

In 2000, Tatum was first cast as a dancer in Ricky Martin's "She Bangs" music video, after an audition in Orlando, Florida; he was paid $400 for the job. His experience in the fashion industry began as a model working for noted clients such as Armani and Abercrombie & Fitch. He soon moved into television commercials, landing national spots for Mountain Dew and Pepsi in 2002. He subsequently signed with Page 305 (Page Parkes Modeling Agency), a modeling agency in Miami. He was cast by Al David for Vogue magazine and soon after appeared in campaigns for Abercrombie & Fitch, Nautica, Dolce & Gabbana, American Eagle Outfitters, and Emporio Armani. He was picked as one of Tear Sheet magazine's "50 Most Beautiful Faces" of October 2001. Tatum signed with Ford Models in New York City.

2006–2012

In 2006, Tatum starred in She's The Man opposite Amanda Bynes, which was named "the greatest Shakespeare adaptation since '10 Things I Hate About You'" by Business Insider. Later that year, Tatum starred opposite his future wife Jenna Dewan in Step Up, which was his breakout role. Although it was widely panned, it has earned $115 million worldwide.

In 2008, Tatum co-starred in director Kimberly Peirce's film Stop-Loss, about soldiers returning home from the Iraq War, and in director Stuart Townsend's film Battle in Seattle, about the 1999 protest of the World Trade Organization meeting in Seattle. Tatum played in the short film The Trap, directed by Rita Wilson.

Tatum and Dito Montiel, who worked together on A Guide to Recognizing Your Saints, reteamed on the action drama Fighting for Rogue Pictures. He starred as Sean McArthur, a young man who scrapes up a living scalping tickets in New York City. He next appeared in writer/director/producer Michael Mann's 2009 crime drama Public Enemies, playing the 1930s American gangster Pretty Boy Floyd. The same year, Tatum starred as Duke in G.I. Joe: The Rise of Cobra, Paramount Pictures' live-action film based on the popular Hasbro action figures. He was initially reluctant to take the role as he feared the movie would glorify war, but overcame his reluctance after reading the script. He played a soldier in Dear John, a film based on the popular Nicholas Sparks bestseller. He later stated that he accepted the role to learn from director Lasse Hallström because he never studied at an acting school.

In an interview with Details magazine, published in early 2012, Tatum said he wants to produce all the films he stars in, "I really don't want to be in any more movies that I don't produce. Unless it's with one of the 10 directors that I really want to work with, I don't have any interest in not being on the ground floor of creating it." He, his wife Dewan, and their production partner Reid Carolin signed a two-year production deal in 2010 with Relativity Media for any movies they may develop during that time. In 2012, Tatum hosted Saturday Night Live and appeared in four films. He co-starred in Steven Soderbergh's action-thriller Haywire, The Vow with Rachel McAdams, and 21 Jump Street (film adaptation of TV series of the same name) with Jonah Hill.

Tatum also starred in Magic Mike, a film based on his eight-month experience as a male stripper in Florida. The film was directed by Soderbergh, was co-produced by Tatum and Soderbergh, and starred Tatum as Mike. He is a featured performer at a Tampa, Florida, male strip club who takes a younger dancer (Alex Pettyfer) under his wing to show him how to hustle "on and off stage". The film's cast also included Matt Bomer, Joe Manganiello, and Matthew McConaughey.

In November 2012, Tatum was named People magazine's annual Sexiest Man Alive.

2013–present 

Tatum appeared in Steven Soderbergh's Side Effects, with Rooney Mara and Jude Law.

He reprised his role as Conrad S. Hauser/Duke in G.I. Joe: Retaliation, the sequel to 2009's G.I. Joe: The Rise of Cobra, in an ensemble cast that included Dwayne Johnson and Bruce Willis. Originally scheduled for release on June 29, 2012, the film was pushed back to March 2013, in order to convert it to 3D and to add more scenes for his character, who was killed at the beginning of the movie. Tatum later said he had not wanted to appear in the sequel and was happy his character had been killed off. Also in 2013, he appeared in another action movie, White House Down.

Tatum reprised his role from 21 Jump Street in its sequel, 22 Jump Street, which was released on June 13, 2014.

Also in 2014, he co-starred with Steve Carell in Foxcatcher, the story of John du Pont, who had schizophrenia and killed Olympic wrestler Dave Schultz, the brother of the character played by Tatum, who also had won Olympic gold. Tatum was set to star as X-Men character Remy LeBeau / Gambit in a solo film, set within the X-Men film universe, which he would have produced, but the film was cancelled in May 2019 after languishing in development hell since 2014. Tatum made his directing debut on Dog, a road-trip comedy tracking a former Army Ranger and his dog that he starred in and co-helmed with regular collaborator Reid Carolin.

Upcoming films

Hollywood Reporter reported in November 2020 that Tatum is set to star in an untitled feature that is described as "a modern day, tongue in cheek thriller" that is inspired by Universal's classic monster features, which will be produced by Phil Lord and Chris Miller. In December 2020, Variety confirmed that Tatum is going to star opposite Sandra Bullock in the Paramount Pictures romantic action adventure film The Lost City. More recently, his production company Free Association signed a first look deal with MGM.

In June 2021, Tatum was set to star in the thriller film Pussy Island marking the directorial debut of Zoë Kravitz. In November 2021, he was cast in an untitled true story drama film with Tom Hardy, directed by George Nolfi. Tatum returned as Mike Lane in Magic Mike's Last Dance with Steven Soderbergh as director. The film was set for an exclusive premiere on HBO Max, but was released in theaters on February 10, 2023. He will star in the remake of German film System Crasher which released in 2019.

Production companiess

Tatum started two production companies, 33andOut Productions and Iron Horse Entertainment. Their first production was the 2010 documentary Earth Made of Glass.

Books 
Tatum has written two picture books inspired by his daughter. The first, The One and Only Sparkella (2021), was a #1 New York Times bestseller for children's picture books the week it published. The One and Only Sparkella Makes a Plan will publish in 2022.

Personal life

In 2006, Tatum met actress Jenna Dewan on the set of their movie Step Up, and they married on July 11, 2009, in Malibu, California. They have one daughter, born in 2013. On April 2, 2018, the couple announced they were separating. Six months later, Dewan filed for divorce from Tatum. The divorce was finalized in November 2019. In a 2023 interview with Vanity Fair, Tatum questioned whether he would ever remarry, though said his divorce prompted self-improvement, including a strong relationship with his daughter. 

Tatum dated English singer Jessie J from 2018 to 2020. In 2021, Tatum started dating Zoë Kravitz.

Filmography

Film

Television

Producer

Music videos

Awards and nominations

References

External links

 

1980 births
21st-century American male actors
Activists from Alabama
American documentary film producers
American film producers
American male dancers
American male erotic dancers
American male film actors
American male television actors
American male voice actors
American people of English descent
American wushu practitioners
Film producers from Florida
Gaither High School alumni
Glenville State Pioneers football players
Living people
Male actors from Alabama
Male actors from Florida
Male actors from Mississippi
Male actors from Tampa, Florida
Male models from Alabama
People from Cullman, Alabama
People from Pascagoula, Mississippi
Actors with dyslexia